Lexington Hills is a census-designated place and an unincorporated area in Santa Clara County, California, United States. The population was 2,492 at the 2020 census. Lexington Hills is the name assigned by the United States Census Bureau to the area, which actually comprises several small communities, including Redwood Estates, Holy City, Chemeketa Park, and Aldercroft Heights.

Geography

Climate
This region experiences warm (but not hot) and dry summers, with no average monthly temperatures above 71.6 °F.  According to the Köppen Climate Classification system, Lexington Hills has a warm-summer Mediterranean climate, abbreviated "Csb" on climate maps.

Demographics

2010
The 2010 United States Census reported that Lexington Hills had a population of 2,421. The racial makeup of Lexington Hills was 2,148 (88.7%) White, 10 (0.4%) African American, 5 (0.2%) Native American, 90 (3.7%) Asian, 0 (0.0%) Pacific Islander, 59 (2.4%) from other races, and 109 (4.5%) from two or more races. Hispanic or Latino of any race were 193 persons (8.0%).

The Census reported that 2,413 people (99.7% of the population) lived in households, 8 (0.3%) lived in non-institutionalized group quarters, and 0 (0%) were institutionalized.

There were 946 households, out of which 321 (33.9%) had children under the age of 18 living in them, 559 (59.1%) were opposite-sex married couples living together, 52 (5.5%) had a female householder with no husband present, 42 (4.4%) had a male householder with no wife present.  There were 55 (5.8%) unmarried opposite-sex partnerships, and 11 (1.2%) same-sex married couples or partnerships. 210 households (22.2%) were made up of individuals, and 51 (5.4%) had someone living alone who was 65 years of age or older. The average household size was 2.55.  There were 653 families (69.0% of all households); the average family size was 2.99.

The population was spread out, with 539 people (22.3%) under the age of 18, 121 people (5.0%) aged 18 to 24, 558 people (23.0%) aged 25 to 44, 948 people (39.2%) aged 45 to 64, and 255 people (10.5%) who were 65 years of age or older.  The median age was 44.8 years. For every 100 females, there were 105.9 males.  For every 100 females age 18 and over, there were 101.9 males.

The homeowner vacancy rate was 1.3%; the rental vacancy rate was 2.6%.  2,026 people (83.7% of the population) lived in owner-occupied housing units and 387 people (16.0%) lived in rental housing units.

2000
As of the census of 2000, there were 2,454 people, 949 households, and 637 families residing in the CDP. The racial makeup of the CDP was 91.85% White, 0.57% African American, 0.49% Native American, 2.20% Asian, 0.04% Pacific Islander, 1.92% from other races, and 2.93% from two or more races. Hispanic or Latino of any race were 5.01% of the population.

There were 949 households, out of which 35.1% had children under the age of 18 living with them, 57.2% were married couples living together, 6.1% had a female householder with no husband present, and 32.8% were non-families. 23.9% of all households were made up of individuals, and 3.3% had someone living alone who was 65 years of age or older.  The average household size was 2.56 and the average family size was 3.03.

In the CDP, the population was spread out, with 25.8% under the age of 18, 4.1% from 18 to 24, 32.5% from 25 to 44, 32.3% from 45 to 64, and 5.3% who were 65 years of age or older.  The median age was 39 years. For every 100 females, there were 104.2 males.  For every 100 females age 18 and over, there were 103.2 males.

The median income for a household in the CDP was $103,955, and the median income for a family was $110,809. Males had a median income of $69,891 versus $51,116 for females. The per capita income for the CDP was $56,235.  About 1.9% of families and 3.3% of the population were below the poverty line, including 4.3% of those under age 18 and 16.3% of those age 65 or over.

Census county division 
Lexington Hills is also the name of a wider unincorporated census county division (CCD) located on the eastern side of the Santa Cruz Mountains in west Santa Clara County, California. The Lexington Hills communities, as well as the former Almaden Air Force Station on Mount Umunhum, and Loma Prieta (highest peak in the Santa Cruz Mountains) are also located in the area.

As of the 2010 US Census, the population of the CCD was 4,009 residents of whom 83.2% were non-Hispanic white, 8.4% Hispanic, 4.0% Asian, and 4.4% of other races, with a median age of 45.0 years old.

Most residents and businesses in the area use postal zip codes from the Lexington Hills CDP and the neighboring cities of Almaden and Los Gatos. The telephone area code is 408.

Government

References

External links 
 Map of Lexington Hills, California

Census-designated places in Santa Clara County, California
Census-designated places in California